The second season of the comedy-drama science fiction television series The Orville was originally broadcast on Fox from December 30, 2018, to April 25, 2019. The season consists of 14 episodes. The season was the last to air on Fox; later seasons streamed on Hulu.

Summary
Ed and Kelly's relationship takes a different turn while the crew meets new aliens, discovers a terrifying secret about Isaac's people and home world, faces the Krill, makes first contact with a new civilization, and revisits the planet Moclus.

Production
"Primal Urges" was initially produced for the first season as Fox had ordered thirteen episodes, but only twelve were broadcast. The episode aired on January 3, 2019, in the United States.

Cast

Main
 Seth MacFarlane as Captain Ed Mercer
 Adrianne Palicki as Commander Kelly Grayson
 Penny Johnson Jerald as Dr. Claire Finn
 Scott Grimes as Lieutenant Gordon Malloy
 Peter Macon as Lieutenant Commander Bortus
 Halston Sage as Lieutenant Alara Kitan 
 Jessica Szohr as Lieutenant Talla Keyali 
 J. Lee as Lieutenant Commander John LaMarr
 Mark Jackson as Isaac

Recurring
 Victor Garber as Admiral Tom Halsey
 Chad L. Coleman as Klyden
 Norm Macdonald as the voice of Lt. Yaphit
 Rachael MacFarlane as the voice of Orville Computer
 BJ Tanner as Marcus Finn
 Kai Wener as Ty Finn
 Mike Henry as Dann
 Chris J. Johnson as Cassius
 Blesson Yates as Topa
 Kyra Santoro as Ensign Jenny Turco
 Ted Danson as Admiral Perry

Guest
 Michaela McManus as Teleya/Lt. Janel Tyler
 Robert Picardo as Ildis Kitan
 Molly Hagan as Drenala Kitan
 Candice King as Solana Kitan
 John Billingsley as Cambis Borrin
 Jason Alexander as Olix
 Patrick Warburton as Lt. Tharl
 Bruce Willis as Groogen (uncredited)
 Carlos Bernard as	Capt. Marcos
 Mackenzie Astin as Lt. Orrin Channing
 Tim Russ as Dr. Sherman
 Leighton Meester as Laura Huggins
 Marina Sirtis as a teacher
 F. Murray Abraham as hearing speaker
 Tony Todd as a Moclan delegate
 Rena Owen as Heveena
 Robin Atkin Downes as Krill Captain Jackazh

Episodes
<onlyinclude>{{Episode table |background=#C9B381 |caption=The Orvilles season 2 episodes |overall=5 |season=5 |title=24 |director=15 |writer=21 |airdate=13 |prodcode=7 |viewers=10 |country=U.S. |episodes=

{{Episode list/sublist|The Orville (season 2)
 |EpisodeNumber   = 22
 |EpisodeNumber2  = 10
 |Title           = Blood of Patriots
 |DirectedBy      = Rebecca Rodriguez
 |WrittenBy       = Seth MacFarlane
 |OriginalAirDate = 
 |ProdCode        = 2LAB09
 |ShortSummary    = The Orville rendezvous with a Krill ship to initiate peace talks. Upon arrival, they find the Krill firing on their own shuttlecraft, which crash lands inside the Orville'''s shuttle bay with two occupants aboard. Gordon recognizes one as his old friend and Union officer, Orrin Channing. He and his daughter, Leyna, have escaped after 20 years in a Krill prison camp. The Krill accuse Orrin of destroying four Krill ships after the cease-fire and threaten to suspend the peace negotiations unless he is turned over. Knowing Orrin would be tortured and killed, Ed refuses their request without an extradition treaty. Meanwhile, Orrin's behavior arouses Talla's suspicions but Gordon vouches for his friend's character. Shortly after, Orrin seeks Gordon's help in procuring a shuttlecraft to execute his plan to disrupt the peace talks. Gordon reports Orrin's request to Talla, though he and Orrin later overpower her as they leave the Orville in a shuttlecraft. This is revealed as a ruse to uncover Orrin's true motive. Meanwhile, Dr. Finn discovers that Leyna is not Orrin's daughter and is of a species whose blood explodes upon contact with nitrogen. Orrin utilized her blood to craft weapons that destroyed the Krill ships, and likewise plots a suicide mission to blow up the Krill vessel to avenge his wife and daughter's deaths. Gordon dons a space suit and escapes the shuttlecraft moments before it explodes with Orrin still aboard. The Orville rescues Gordon, and later Ed and the Krill sign a preliminary peace agreement.
 |Viewers         = 2.94
 |LineColor       = C9B381
}}

}}</onlyinclude>

Music
The soundtrack album for the season was released by La-La Land Records on January 19, 2021. A digital release followed on January 22.

Reception
Critical response
The second season of The Orville received very positive reviews in contrast to a mostly negative reaction for the first season. On Rotten Tomatoes, season 2 has a 100% approval rating with an average rating of 7.6/10 based on 14 reviews. The website's critic consensus states: "Fun, focused, and surprisingly thoughtful, The Orville's second season makes good use of its talented crew."

Will Harris of The Verge'' praised the two-part episode "Identity", which ran on February 21 and 28, as a sign that the series was maturing into "serious science fiction" that would appeal to a wider audience. Harris noted that the series had also toned down the "dodgier" side of its humor while still maintaining sporadic 21st-century popular cultural references.

Ratings

References

External links
 
 

The Orville
2018 American television seasons
2019 American television seasons